Tumenko is a gender-neutral Slavic surname. Notable people with the surname include:

Aleksandr Tumenko (born 1983), Russian football player
Dmitri Tumenko (born 1989), Russian football player

Russian-language surnames